David Lyle Sloan (born June 8, 1972) is an American former professional football player who was a tight end in the National Football League (NFL) for the Detroit Lions and New Orleans Saints.

He is currently the tight ends coach and recruiting coordinator for Rice University.

Early playing career
Sloan initially bypassed football for basketball, enrolling at Fresno City College, a junior college in Fresno, California.  He played basketball for the Rams as a freshman and sophomore, earning All-Conference academic honors both years.  Sloan then transferred to the University of New Mexico, where he played college football during his junior and senior years for Lobos head coach Dennis Franchione.  He earned All-WAC honorable mention in 1993, and All-WAC first-team honors in 1994.

Following his senior year, Sloan participated in the Senior Bowl and Blue–Gray Football Classic.  He was also selected to participate in the NFL Scouting Combine prior to the 1995 NFL Draft.

NFL career
Sloan was drafted by the Detroit Lions in the third round (70th overall) of the 1995 National Football League Draft.  He was the seventh tight end drafted.  Sloan played for the Lions for seven seasons from 1995-2001.

Sloan's best season came in 1999 when he had 47 receptions for 591 yards and 4 touchdowns, earning him a spot on the 2000 NFC Pro Bowl team.  He was the first tight end from the 1995 draft class to make a Pro Bowl, and was the first Lions tight end to make a Pro Bowl since David Hill in 1979.  Sloan was also named as an alternate to the 2001 NFC Pro Bowl team.

Sloan signed a four-year, $7.05 million contract with the New Orleans Saints in 2002. He was released by the Saints following the 2003 season, and ultimately retired

During his career, Sloan dealt with numerous injuries including chronic knee and toe pain that required several surgeries.  He also suffered a broken hand and had arthroscopic surgery on his shoulder.

Sloan finished his NFL career with 192 receptions for 2,151 yards and 15 touchdowns over 9 seasons.

NFL career statistics

Coaching career
In 2009, Sloan embarked on a coaching career, working as an assistant special teams and tight ends coach at Southwest Baptist University, an NCAA Division II school in Missouri. Sloan had enrolled in the NFLPA Coaching Intern program, which works with Division II/III schools to help former players begin a career in coaching.

In 2010, Sloan joined Rice University as a graduate assistant under Owls head coach David Bailiff.  Baliff had previously served as an assistant coach at the University of New Mexico when Sloan was a player.  He remained on staff for the 2011 season as a quality control assistant.

In 2012, Sloan was promoted to tight ends coach and assistant special teams coach.  Sloan notably coached two tight ends who were both drafted in 2013: Luke Willson and Vance McDonald.

In 2014, Sloan picked up the title of recruiting coordinator in addition to coaching the tight ends.  His primary recruiting area is the Dallas–Fort Worth metroplex

In 2020, Sloan is now a coach for Bellaire High School in Houston, Texas as an offensive lineman coach.

Personal life
Sloan and his ex-wife Jennifer have two daughters, Trinity and Bently. He has since married Angela Thompson of Houston. They have a daughter named Braxton.

Sloan remains a fan of the Detroit Lions and keeps in touch with several former teammates.  On September 30, 2008, he served as an honorary captain for a game against the Chicago Bears.

References

1972 births
Living people
Sportspeople from Fresno, California
American football tight ends
Detroit Lions players
New Orleans Saints players
National Conference Pro Bowl players
New Mexico Lobos football players
Fresno City Rams men's basketball players
Southwest Baptist Bearcats football coaches
American men's basketball players